Khopoli is an industrial city in the Khalapur taluka of Raigad district, in the Indian state of Maharashtra, at the base of the Sahyadri mountains. Patalganga River, which is the tailrace channel of the Tata Hydroelectric Power Station, flows through Khopoli.

It is a municipal council and is a part of the Mumbai Metropolitan Region.

Khopoli is served by a railway station connected to the Mumbai suburban railway by a single line from Karjat. The distance between CSMT to Khopoli is  along the Central Railway Suburban Line, which is a broad gauge line carrying electric locomotives.

Initially, Khopoli railway station had only one platform for both the up and down movement of local trains. In 2019, it was revamped with an additional platform.

Industries are well developed due to the strategic importance of the region as the Mumbai-Pune Expressway passes through the city. The city is called a city of waterfalls due to a number of waterfalls in the rainy season. Due to the presence of industries, the city has attracted migrants from across India. The tourism industry has seen an uptick from a few years.

Khopoli is home to various Marathi, English, Hindi and even international schools. It has seen rapid growth in industry.

Geography and history 
Khopoli was called Campoolie during the British Raj.
Khopoli is located at 18°45' N, 73°20'. It is situated at about 61 m above mean sea level. It falls under three Pincodes - Khopoli 410203, Khopoli Power House 410204 and Jagdish Nagar 410216. STD code for Khopoli is (0)2192.

A colonial source describes Khopoli as follows: 
There was an annachatra or a free feeding house, in the vicinity of the Mahadev temple, but by 1882 all that remained of it were huge grinding stones. 
The GIPR line was extended to Khopoli in 1856.

Khopoli is the site of the first privately owned hydroelectric power station in India built by the Tatas.

Climate
Khopoli has a tropical monsoon climate (Am) with little to no rainfall from November to May and extremely heavy rainfall from June to September with moderately heavy showers in October.

Demographics
In the 2011 India census, Khopoli had a population of 108,648. Males constitute 53% of the population and females 47%. Khopoli has an average literacy rate of 74%, higher than the national average of 59.5%. Male literacy is 80%, and female literacy is 68%. Thirteen per cent of the population is under 6 years of age.

Industries
The factories in Khopoli municipal limits are:
 Alta Laboratories Limited, a bulk chemical manufacturer and a pioneer and still India's largest producer of salicylic acid and its various derivatives.
 Bohler-Uddeholm India Limited
 Bombay Oxygen Limited
 Government Milk Scheme, Khopoli
 India Steel Works Limited, Bright Bar Division 
 Innovassynth Technologies Limited (Formerly Indian Organic Chemicals)
 Isibars Limited, Special Steels Division
 Mahindra Sanyo Pvt Ltd
 Mohan Rockey Spring Water Breweries Limited
 Paper & Pulp Conversions Ltd (PAPCO), a pioneering paper & paperboard mill started by industrialist Baburaoji Parkhe. The first industry in Khopoli which brought electricity to the town. Started operations in Khopoli in 1949 and closed down in 1990. 
 SANPlast PVT LTD Limited
 Tata Hydro Electric Power Supply Company Limited
Tata steel BSL 
 Wärtsilä India Limited. Wärtsilä Corp, its parent company, is a Finland-based equipment provider; it plans to convert this unit into a global manufacturing and sourcing unit.
 Wheelabrator Alloy Castings Limited
 Zenith Steel Pipes Limited

Educational institutions
Various institutions run schools, colleges and a polytechnic.

Khalapur Taluka Shikshan Prasarak Mandal
Khalapur Taluka Shikshan Prasarak Mandal runs the following institutions in Khopoli:
 Yak Public School (English Medium School CBSE affiliated)
 Maharashtra IAS/MPSC Academy
 Jagdish Chandra Mahindra Memorial School
 Shishu Mandir Khopoli (English Medium School)
 Janata Vidyalaya Junior College
 Janata Vidyalaya (Marathi Medium School)
 Khopoli Hindi Vidyalaya (Hindi Medium School)
 K. M. C. College (affiliated to Mumbai University)
 Khopoli Polytechnic
 Sahyadri Vidyalaya
 Zenith High School (English Medium School)
 Gagangiri English International School, Khopoli
 Anand Shala, Khopoli

Culture, religion, and tourism 
Khopoli has a "fine oval shaped reservoir" and a temple of God Mahadev as Vireshwar built by Nana Phadnavis. The reservoir is built of solid and strong black rock and is oval shaped. The circumference of the reservoir is about 1207 m and it covers an area of about 75000 sq m. The reservoir holds excellent water throughout the year. The reservoir has surrounding walls also built in stone and are of a width of about 1.5 m to 1.8 m. The reservoir has stone steps leading to the water. The temple is of a height of about 22.9 m m from the base to the top and the foundation measures 12.2 m x 6.1 m. Inside is the image of God Shiva. The Sabha mandap measures about 6.1 m x 3.1 m. At the entrance of the temple is a samadhi. A fair is held in honor of the temple deity on Mahashivaratri day - Maagha Vadya 13.

The PAPCO Mill complex has a Parashurama temple and Fire temple or Agni Mandir which was built in 1971.
The Gagangiri Maharaj Ashram is located in Khopoli, it is there that Gagangiri Maharaj died on 4 February 2008.

The Akhil Bharatha Ayyappa Seva Sangham, includes the Ayyappa Temple, in its list of Ayyappa temples in India and abroad.

The major tourist attractions in the city include Adlabs Imagica, which is India's largest theme park. Mahad Ganpati Temple, Zenith Waterfalls, and Gangangiri Maharaj Ashram Lonavala is just 8 km away from the city.

Notable people 
Raghunath Vaman Dighe (1896-1980), Marathi writer

References 

Cities and towns in Raigad district